Paraplosia is a genus of moths in the subfamily Arctiinae. It contains the single species Parapalosia cinderella, which is found in French Guiana.

References

External links
 Natural History Museum Lepidoptera generic names catalog

Lithosiini